Hahamongna and Hahamog-na are historic Tongva-Gabrieleño Native American settlements in the Verdugo Mountains of Southern California,  named after the local Tongva band's name Hahamog'na, in present-day Pasadena and Glendale in Los Angeles County, California.

Locations

Hahamog-na - Arroyo Seco
The well studied location named Hahamog-na is the Tongva village archeological site located in the upper Arroyo Seco area just above the Devil's Gate in the present-day Altadena-Pasadena-Jet Propulsion Laboratory-JPL area. It is in the Arroyo Seco canyon-valley and on the lower slopes where the eastern Verdugo Mountains, southern San Gabriel Mountains, and western San Rafael Hills meet.  The site of Hahamog-na is now within the protected natural area of Hahamongna Watershed Park, a  habitat and plant community blend of: Freshwater marsh wetlands, riparian zones, native oak woodlands, and chaparral elfin forests. This Tongva settlement was later a rancheria on the large 1834 Mexican land grant of Rancho San Pascual, issued by Alta California Governor José Figueroa to  Juan Maríne and Eulalia Pérez de Guillén Mariné.

Hahamongna - Glendale
A second settlement site located in present-day Glendale and named Hahamongna existed on the lower southwestern Verdugo Mountains slopes and the eastern San Fernando Valley plain, with the free-flowing Los Angeles River just south. This village location would later be on the western portion of Rancho San Rafael, an early Spanish land grant in 1784 issued by Las Californias Governor Pedro Fages to Spanish Corporal José María Verdugo (1751–1831), in present-day Glendale in the San Fernando Valley.

Hahamog-na Tongva people
The band of Tongva people living in the Verdugo Mountains area, that both settlement locations are within, were named the Hahamog-na and Hahamongna by some Spanish-Mexican eras 'neighbors' and later Euro-American immigrants and historians. The two settlements sharing the 'same sounding' name, with different spellings given by non-native people, may stem from the band inhabiting both places. Research with present-day Tongva-Gabrieleño people, historical researchers and ethnologists, and supported by citations is needed.

See also
Category: Tongva populated places — all Tongva settlement articles
Tongva language
Category: Tongva - all Tongva articles
Indigenous peoples of California
Population of Native California
Rancho La Cañada - adjacent on northeast
List of Ranchos of California

References

Reference citations for the Hahamongna and Tongva entries in the Rancho San Pascual and Eulalia Pérez de Guillén Mariné Wikipedia articles.

External links

  Hahamongna  locator Map
Save Hahamongna.org website — ongoing open space and historic sites protection, and riparian zone restoration projects.

Tongva populated places
History of Pasadena, California
History of the San Fernando Valley
History of Los Angeles County, California
Parks in Los Angeles County, California
Former settlements in Los Angeles County, California
Arroyo Seco (Los Angeles County)
Altadena, California
Verdugo Mountains